Tukamai or Tukaram Chaitanya was an Indian mystic and spiritual master. He was born to Brahmin parents Kashinathpanta and Parvatibai at Sukali Veer, a village in present-day Hingoli district, Maharashtra. He was a disciple of Swami Chinmayananda of Umerkhed.
Brahmachaitanya, a 19th century Indian saint and spiritual master was one of his prominent disciples.

References

19th-century Hindu religious leaders
20th-century Hindu religious leaders
Marathi people
People from Hingoli district